The 2020–21 Copa del Rey was the 119th staging of the Copa del Rey (including two seasons where two rival editions were played). The winners are assured a place in the 2021–22 UEFA Europa League group stage. Both the winners and the runners-up qualified for the four-team 2021–22 Supercopa de España.

Real Sociedad were the defending champions, having won the postponed final of the previous edition, which was held two weeks before the 2021 final. They were already eliminated by Real Betis in the round of 16 of the 2020–21 edition, before the previous final had been played. Barcelona won the final 4–0 against Athletic Bilbao for a record 31st Copa del Rey title.

As across Spain, match times up to 25 October 2020 and from 28 March 2021 were CEST (UTC+2). Times on interim ("winter") days were CET (UTC+1).

Schedule and format
On 14 September 2020, the RFEF released the calendar of the competition and confirmed the format of the previous season would remain.

Notes
The semi-finals used the away goals rule.
Games ending in a draw were decided in extra time, and if still level, by a penalty shoot-out.

Qualified teams
The following teams qualified for the competition. Reserve teams were excluded.

Preliminary round

Draw
Teams were divided into four groups according to geographical criteria.

Matches

Notes

First round
The first round was played by all the qualified teams, except for the four participants of the 2020–21 Supercopa de España. The ten winners from the previous preliminary round were paired with ten teams from La Liga. The remaining six teams and the 22 teams of the Segunda División were paired with the four Copa Federación semi-finalists, the fourteen teams that competed in the Tercera División and ten teams from Segunda B. Finally, the remaining 36 teams from Segunda B were paired between them. In the case of opponents from the same division, the home advantage was decided by whichever team was drawn first; otherwise, the match was held in the stadium of the lower division team. A total of 56 games were played, with 112 participating teams, from 15 to 30 December 2020.

Draw
The draw was held on 16 November at the Estadio de La Cartuja, Seville. Teams were divided into five pots.

Matches

Second round

Draw
The draw was held on 18 December in the RFEF headquarters in Las Rozas. Teams were divided into four pots according to their division in the 2020–21 season. Tercera División teams were drawn with others from La Liga, while the remaining Segunda B and Tercera teams were drawn with teams from La Liga and Segunda División. Matches were played at the home of the lower-ranked team.

† The identity of this team was unknown at the time of the draw

Matches

Final phase

Bracket

Round of 32

Draw
The four participant teams of the 2020–21 Supercopa de España were drawn with the teams from the lowest category. After them, the remaining teams from the lowest categories faced the rest of La Liga teams. Matches were played at the home of the lower-ranked team, with exceptions due to Storm Filomena noted below. The draw was held on 8 January 2021.

Matches

Notes

Round of 16

Draw
Teams of La Liga were firstly drawn against the teams from Segunda and Segunda B, with those matches to be played at the Segunda/Segunda B teams' homes, and then the remaining six teams of La Liga were drawn against each other. The draw was held on 22 January 2021.

Matches

Quarter-finals

Draw
All eight teams were in one pot, and the home team was decided by the luck of the draw. As the only remaining Segunda División side, Almería hosted its opponent regardless, as per the rules. The draw was held on 29 January 2021.

Matches

Semi-finals

Draw
The draw for the semi-finals was held on 5 February 2021.

Summary

|}

Matches

Barcelona won 3–2 on aggregate.

Athletic Bilbao won 3–2 on aggregate.

Final

Top scorers

Notes

References

External links
Royal Spanish Football Federation official website
Copa del Rey at LFP website

2020-21
1